The Swiss National Library  is the national library of Switzerland. Part of the Federal Office of Culture, it is charged with collecting, cataloging and conserving information in all fields, disciplines, and media connected with Switzerland, as well as ensuring the widest possible accessibility and dissemination of such data.

The Swiss National Library is intended to be open to all and, by the breadth and scope of its collection, aims to reflect the plurality and diversity of Swiss culture. It is a heritage site of national significance.

History
On June 28, 1894, an Act of Council created the library with the responsibility of collecting "Helvetica": all publications relating to the Swiss and Switzerland. In 1899, the library opened to the public in the Federal Archives building. In 1931, the library moved to a newly-constructed building on Hallwylstrasse. The building was designed in the Modernist style of New Objectivity and is a listed historic monument.

In 1991, a plan was made to construct underground stacks and modernize the building. The first underground stack opened in 1997 and holds books, literary archives, and special collections. The second underground stack opened in 2009 and holds newspapers and periodicals. The library expects it will have reserve storage capacity until 2038. Between 1994 and 2001, the library building was renovated to modernize and extend it.

In 2000, the Centre Dürrenmatt Neuchâtel, a museum of Friedrich Dürrenmatt's works, opened as a unit of the library in Neuchâtel.

Collections 
The Swiss National Library collection includes an extensive collection of books, newspapers, maps and atlases, official publications and printed music. The National Library's book collection contains the entire output of Swiss publishers in all languages and adds almost 15,000 new publications in a given year. There is no legal deposit law in place but rather an agreement with Swiss publishers. As of 2020, the library held 4.8 million publications.

Special collections that are housed at the National Library include the Lüthi Bible Collection, musical estates, the Archives of the New Helvetic Society and many more collections on topics including library science, press and radio, politics, sports, science and genealogy.

The National Library has an extensive poster collection as part of its Prints and Drawings department that covers Swiss poster production. The poster collection includes the Claude Kuhn Archive, which features over 350 posters created by the Bernese artist.

Activities 
In 1901, the library published the first volume of The Swiss Book, the national bibliography of Switzerland. Editions are published each year.

In 1928, the Swiss Union Catalog was formed to create a central catalog for all Swiss libraries. In 1979, the National Library took over the catalog's management from the Swiss Librarians' Association. In 2010, with the advent of digital catalogs, the service closed.

Since 1995, the library has housed the ISSN Centre Switzerland which assigns ISSNs to Swiss serial publications.

In 1998, the Swiss Literary Archives were established as division of the National Library to collect literary estates and archives. In 2016, the Swiss National Sound Archives came under the organization of the library.

Quarto is the journal of the Swiss National Library and focuses on a different one of Switzerland's four literatures (German, French, Italian and Romansh) with texts and essays on the featured literature. The journal is published once or twice each year.

See also 
 Staatsarchiv Zürich
 Swiss Book
 Swiss Federal Archives

References

External links 
  
 HelveticAll – Online library catalogue

1895 establishments in Switzerland
Buildings and structures in Bern
Cultural property of national significance in the canton of Bern
National Library
Libraries established in 1895
Libraries in Switzerland
Library buildings completed in 1931
National libraries
20th-century architecture in Switzerland